KJIA is a Christian radio station licensed to Spirit Lake, Iowa, broadcasting on 88.9 MHz FM.  KJIA serves Northwest Iowa and Southwest Minnesota.  The station is owned by Minn-Iowa Christian Broadcasting, Inc.

References

External links
KJIA's official website

JIA
Radio stations established in 2002
2002 establishments in Iowa